Linden is a historic home located at Prince Frederick, Calvert County, Maryland. It is a two-story frame house, conservatively Italianate in style built about 1868, with conservative Colonial Revival additions of about 1907. Behind the house are ten standing outbuildings, seven dating to the 19th century, three of which are of log construction. It is home to the Calvert County Historical Society.

It was listed on the National Register of Historic Places in 2000.

Gallery

References

External links

Calvert County Historical Society
, including photo from 2000, at Maryland Historical Trust

Houses on the National Register of Historic Places in Maryland
Houses in Calvert County, Maryland
Colonial Revival architecture in Maryland
Italianate architecture in Maryland
Houses completed in 1868
National Register of Historic Places in Calvert County, Maryland
Prince Frederick, Maryland